The coat of arms of Barrow-in-Furness is the official symbol of Barrow Borough Council, the governing body of the Borough of Barrow-in-Furness, England. The arms were officially granted on 13 December 1867 to the County Borough of Barrow-in-Furness. Upon the amalgamation of the County Borough and adjacent Dalton-in-Furness Urban District on 16 April 1975 the arms were adopted by the Barrow Borough Council.

Symbolism
The chief of the arms incorporates a steam ship, emblematic of Barrow's shipping and port related industries. Below diagonally intercepting the arms is a band containing a bee and arrow to reflect the town's name (B-arrow). The stag and serpent either side are taken from the crests of the Duke of Buccleuch and the Duke of Devonshire respectively, who were the principal landowners at the time of Barrow's early growth. The ram's head a top of the arms symbolises Sir James Ramsden, Barrow's first mayor and a major figure in the development of the town. The Latin script below reads 'Semper Sursum', which is the town's motto meaning 'ever onwards'.

Use
The 'bee and arrow' element of the arms has been incorporated within the crest of Barrow A.F.C., while the arms themselves are emblazoned on several Barrow buildings including the Town Hall, Nan Tait Centre, John Whinnerah Institute and Abbey Road Working Men's Club.

References

Coat of arms
Barrow-in-Furness
Barrow-in-Furness
Barrow-in-Furness
Barrow-in-Furness
Barrow-in-Furness
Barrow-in-Furness
Barrow-in-Furness